Michael Kraus (born 26 September 1955 in Gladbeck) is a German former swimmer who competed in the 1976 Summer Olympics.

References

1955 births
Living people
German male swimmers
German male butterfly swimmers
Olympic swimmers of West Germany
Swimmers at the 1976 Summer Olympics
Olympic bronze medalists for West Germany
Olympic bronze medalists in swimming
World Aquatics Championships medalists in swimming
European Aquatics Championships medalists in swimming
Medalists at the 1976 Summer Olympics
Universiade medalists in swimming
Universiade gold medalists for West Germany
Universiade silver medalists for West Germany
Medalists at the 1977 Summer Universiade
Medalists at the 1979 Summer Universiade
People from Gladbeck
Sportspeople from Münster (region)